The 2021–22 season was Alashkert's tenth season in the Armenian Premier League and fifteenth overall.

Season events
On 1 July, Alashkert announced the signing of José Embaló from Olimpia Grudziądz, with Aghvan Davoyan, Béko Fofana, Artak Yedigaryan, David Khurtsidze, Deou Dosa and James all signing the following day.

On 16 July, Alashkert announced the signings of Vladislav Kryuchkov, Aghvan Papikyan and Levon Bayramyan.

On 22 July, Alashkert announced that Aleksandr Grigoryan had left the club by mutual consent due to his wife's poor health, returning to the club on 31 July.

On 15 August, Alashkert announced the signing of Lucas Serra from Canaã.

On 3 September, Alashkert announced the signing of Marko Milinković who'd previously played for Giresunspor.

On 11 September, Alashkert announced the signing of Brazilian forwards Matheus Alessandro and Nixon. The following day, 11 September, Alashkert announced the signings of Artem Gyurjyan and Yevgeni Yatchenko.

On 20 September, Aleksandr Grigoryan left his role as Head Coach, with Milan Milanović being appointed as Alashkerts new Head Coach on 26 September.

On 13 January, Alashkert announced that Milan Milanović had left his role as Head Coach after his contract had expired, with Aram Voskanyan being announced as his replacement.

On 25 January, Alashkert announced the signing of Dmitry Guz from Atyrau. The following day, 26 January, Alashkert announced the signing of Manvel Agaronyan from Luki-Energiya Velikiye Luki, with Alexey Rodionov joining on 27 January from Atyrau.

On 3 February, Alashkert announced the signing of Vahagn Ayvazyan, Gagik Daghbashyan and Andranik Voskanyan from Van. The following day Alashkert announced the signing of Alexander Ter-Tovmasyan from Pyunik, with Aleksandr Karapetyan joining the following day after he'd left Noah earlier in the transfer window.

On 23 February, Alashkert announced the signings of Vitinho from Urartu and Artyom Potapov from Kaisar.

Squad

Transfers

In

Out

Released

Friendlies

Competitions

Overall record

Supercup

Premier League

Results summary

Results by round

Results

Table

Armenian Cup

UEFA Champions League

Qualifying rounds

UEFA Europa League

Qualifying rounds

UEFA Europa Conference League

Group stage

Statistics

Appearances and goals

|-
|colspan="16"|Players away on loan:
|-
|colspan="16"|Players who left Alashkert during the season:

|}

Goal scorers

Clean sheets

Disciplinary record

References

FC Alashkert seasons
Alashkert
Alashkert
Alashkert
Alashkert